Gbôklé Region is one of the 31 regions of Ivory Coast. Since its establishment in 2011, it has been one of three regions in Bas-Sassandra District. The seat of the region is Sassandra and the region's population in the 2021 census was 460,980.

Gbôklé is currently divided into two departments: Fresco and Sassandra.

Notes

 
Regions of Bas-Sassandra District
States and territories established in 2011
2011 establishments in Ivory Coast